Benjamin Luke Dougall (born 16 December 1991) is an Australian cricketer who plays for South Australia.

Dougall currently plays as the professional for the Wanderers in the Ribblesdale League.

See also
 List of South Australian representative cricketers

References

1985 births
Australian cricketers
South Australia cricketers
Living people